Michael Anthony Loh (born 1962) is a lieutenant general in the United States Air Force, who serves as the 13th Director of the Air National Guard. He previously served as the adjutant general of the Colorado National Guard from April 2017 to July 2020, and as the National Guard assistant to the commander of Air Combat Command from April 2016 to April 2017. Loh is the son of a former commander of Air Combat Command, General John M. Loh. Loh received his commission through the United States Air Force Academy in 1984 He assumed his current assignment on July 28, 2020,

Awards and decorations

Effective dates of promotions

References

Living people
1962 births
United States Air Force Academy alumni
Recipients of the Defense Superior Service Medal
Recipients of the Legion of Merit